Dangal (International title: Honor) is a 2006 Philippine television drama series broadcast by GMA Network. The series is the seventh and final instalment of Now and Forever. Directed by Mac Alejandre, it stars Jennylyn Mercado and Dennis Trillo. It premiered on September 25, 2006 replacing Linlang. The series concluded on November 24, 2006 with a total of 45 episodes.

Cast and characters

Lead cast
 Jennylyn Mercado as Altamira "Alta" Roxas-Marquez
 Dennis Trillo as Adrianno "Adrian" Marquez

Supporting cast
 Desiree del Valle as Giovanna Guillermo-Roxas
 Cherie Gil as Chandra Remedios
 Melissa Mendez as Corrina Roxas-Marquez
 Mat Ranillo III as Ricardo Marquez
 Ciara Sotto as Celestina "Celestine" Soledad
 Katya Santos as Lianna "Iyanna" Regalado
 Ella Cruz as Florentina "Flor" Gonzavo
 Polo Ravales as Miguelito "Miguel" Dominguez
 Andrew Schimmer as Inigo Regalado

References

External links
 

2006 Philippine television series debuts
2006 Philippine television series endings
Filipino-language television shows
GMA Network drama series
Television shows set in the Philippines